Mya Hnin Yee Lwin (also spelled Mya Hnin Yi Lwin, born 12 January 1987) is a Burmese television and film actress. She has become popular among the audience with the film Angel of Eden which brought her wider recognition. Mya Hnin Yee Lwin was a high-profile model in Myanmar and achieved success as an actress. She was also one of the most active actresses in the 2021 Spring Revolution (Military Dictatorship Revolution).

Early life and education
Mya Hnin Yee Lwin was born on 12 January 1987 in Yangon, Myanmar She is the youngest child among four siblings. She attended high school at Basic Education High School No. 2 Kamayut and graduated from Dagon University with a degree in Psychology.

Career
Mya Hnin Yee Lwin entered the entertainment industry in 2010, and appeared in Sai Sai Kham Leng's MTV "Ever Golli". She then appeared on billboards for commercial advertisement in 2011. In 2012, she was selected the Academy Ban Kine, the person tasked with holding the tray of the Academy statue at the Myanmar Academy Awards Ceremony. After that, she worked as a photo model but faded from the limelight in 2014.

She made her acting debut with the film Eden's Angel where she played the main role with Sai Sai Kham Leng, Paing Phyo Thu, Wint Yamone Naing and May Grace Perry  which screened in Myanmar cinemas in 2016. Her portrayal of the character Saung Hninsi earned praised by fans for her acting performance and character interpretation, and experienced a resurgence of popularity. She was cast in her first television series Nway Kanar Oo alongside Si Thu Win and Htun Eaindra Bo, aired on MRTV-4 in 2017. She then starred in her second series Kyamar Noon alongside Min Oo, Yan Kyaw, Phoe Thaut Kyar, May Thinzar Oo, Hsu Hlaing Hnin, Soe Nandar Kyaw, aired on MRTV in 2018. Then she had to play in several series; Zanee Chaw Myar Konyet, Toxic, Wingaba Shin Tan and Tatiya Myauk Sone Mak in 2018.

She gain increased popularity again with her role as Wai Hnin Phyu in the hit drama Ngwe Satku 7 Yawt, alongside Hein Htet, Thi Ha, Aung Khant Hmue, Zin Wine, Nang Sandar Hla Htun and Jue Jue K, aired on MRTV-4 in 2019.

Political activities
Following the 2021 Myanmar coup d'état, Mya Hnin Yee Lwin was active in the anti-coup movement both in person at rallies and through social media. Denouncing the military coup, she has taken part in protests since February. She joined the "We Want Justice" three-finger salute movement. The movement was launched on social media, and many celebrities have joined the movement.

On 6 April 2021, warrants for her arrest were issued under section 505 (a) of the Myanmar Penal Code by the State Administration Council for speaking out against the military coup. Along with several other celebrities, she was charged with calling for participation in the Civil Disobedience Movement (CDM) and damaging the state's ability to govern, with supporting the Committee Representing Pyidaungsu Hluttaw, and with generally inciting the people to disturb the peace and stability of the nation.

Selected filmography

Film
Angel of Eden (အေဒင်ရဲ့နတ်သမီး) (2016)
Yee Sar Ta Won Kwal (ရည်းစားတဝမ်းကွဲ) (2018)
The Masks (မျက်နှာဖုံးများ) (TBA)
Miles Away Under The Moon (လရဲ့အောက်ဖတ်မိုင်အဝေးမှာ) (TBA)
Promise (ကတိ) (TBA)

Television series

Personal life
Mya Hnin Yee Lwin married to Myo Thwin in December 2014 and divorced in 2020.

References

1987 births
Living people
21st-century Burmese actresses